Christian Augustus Siebe (known by his middle name; 1788 – 15 April 1872) was a German-born British engineer chiefly known for his contributions to diving equipment.

Contribution to diving 

In the 1830s the Deane brothers asked Siebe to make a variation of their smoke helmet design for underwater use. Later they turned to him to produce more helmets for diving operations. Expanding on improvements already made by another engineer, George Edwards, Siebe produced his own design; a helmet fitted to a full length watertight canvas diving suit. The real success of the equipment was a valve in the helmet.

Colonel Charles Pasley, leader of the Royal Navy team that used Siebe's suit on the wreck of  suggested the helmet should be detachable from the corset, giving rise to the typical standard diving dress which revolutionised underwater civil engineering, underwater salvage, commercial diving and naval diving.

The company that carried his name Siebe Gorman Ltd was founded by him and his son-in-law, Gorman.

He is commemorated by a blue plaque on his former home in Denmark Street, London.

Other inventions
Besides his contributions to diving he also invented: 
a rotating water pump patented in 1828,
A paper making machine,
a Dial weighing scale,
an ice-making machine.

Siebe won many medals at the Great Exhibition in 1851 and the Paris Exhibition in 1855.

He died 15 April 1872 of chronic bronchitis, at his London home. He was buried at the West Norwood Cemetery.

See also
Siebe Gorman

References

External links

Historical Diving Society

1788 births
1872 deaths
British marine engineers
British underwater divers
Burials at West Norwood Cemetery
Deaths from bronchitis
Diving engineers
Place of birth missing